The 1990–91 FA Cup was the 110th season of the world's oldest knockout football competition, The Football Association Challenge Cup, or FA Cup for short. Tottenham Hotspur won the competition after coming from 1–0 behind in the final against Nottingham Forest to win 2–1 and take the trophy. It gave Tottenham their eighth victory in nine FA Cup Finals and their first since their wins in 1981 and 1982.

First round proper

Teams from the Football League Third and Fourth Division entered in this round plus four non-league teams were given byes to this round: Barrow, Leek Town, Colchester United and Sutton United. The first round of games were played over the weekend 17–18 November 1990, with replays being played on 20–21 November.

Second round proper

The second round of games were played either over the weekend 7–8 December 1990, with replays being played on 11–12 December; or they were played in the midweek, from 10–12 December, with replays being played on 17 December.

Third round proper

Teams from the Football League First and Second Division entered in this round. The third round of games in the FA Cup were played over the weekend 5–7 January 1991, with replays being played on 8, 9, 16, 21 and 28 January. Of the three non-league sides remaining in the competition, Woking defeated Second Division opponents West Bromwich Albion 4–2.

Fourth round proper

The fourth round of games were mainly played over the weekend 26–27 January 1991, with replays being played on 29–30 January. The Arsenal-Leeds United game ended in a draw three times, with the two extra replays being played on 13 and 16 February. Because Nottingham Forest did not finish their third round tie until 28 January, their fourth round match was not played until 13 February with a replay on 18 February.

Fifth round proper

The fifth set of games were mainly played over the weekend 16–18 February 1991, with replays being played on 20 February. The Merseyside derby went to an extra replay played on 27 February, the last FA Cup tie to go to multiple replays before a rule change the following season limited ties to one replay. Kenny Dalglish resigned as Liverpool's manager between the two replays. Because Nottingham Forest did not win their fourth round tie until 18 February, their fifth round match was not played until 25 February with a replay on 4 March. Similarly, Arsenal were late beating Leeds United in the previous round and so played Shrewsbury Town on 27 February.

Sixth round proper

Semi-finals

Tottenham's 3–1 triumph over Arsenal, marked by a Paul Gascoigne goal from 35 yards, ended their opposition's chances of the double.

Nottingham Forest beat West Ham United 4–0 to reach their first FA Cup final for 32 years and give Brian Clough the chance of winning his first FA Cup to add to the two European Cups, one league title and four League Cups that he had already won with them.

Final

An own goal by Des Walker in extra time gave Tottenham Hotspur their eighth FA Cup triumph, a record at the time. Paul Gascoigne went off with a knee injury in the opening 15 minutes, and Gary Lineker had a first-half penalty saved by Nottingham Forest goalkeeper Mark Crossley.

Media coverage
For the third consecutive season in the United Kingdom, the BBC were the free to air broadcasters while Sky Sports were the subscription broadcasters.

The live matches on the BBC were: Crystal Palace vs Nottingham Forest (R3); Arsenal vs Leeds United (R4); Liverpool vs Everton (R5); Tottenham Hotspur vs Notts County (QF); both Tottenham Hotspur vs Arsenal and Nottingham Forest vs West Ham United (SF); and Tottenham Hotspur vs Nottingham Forest (Final).  The BBC did not show a goal live until the quarter finals.

References

External links
 The FA Cup at TheFA.com
 FA Cup at BBC.co.uk
 FA Cup news at Reuters.co.uk

 
FA Cup seasons
Fa Cup, 1990-91
1990–91 domestic association football cups